Poldasht (Azerbaijani: Daş Körpü , also Romanized as Pol Dasht, Pol’desht, Pol-e Dasht, and Pul Dasht; also known as Araplar) is a city in the Central District of Poldasht County, West Azerbaijan province, Iran, and serves as capital of the county. At the 2006 census, its population was 8,584 in 2,205 households. The following census in 2011 counted 9,963 people in 2,658 households. The latest census in 2016 showed a population of 11,472 people in 3,377 households, all of them Azerbaijanis. The city lies on the western bank of the Aras River. 

Poldasht is a Persian word meaning arable land by the bridge. The city is situated near the border crossing with the Nakhchivan Autonomous Republic of Azerbaijan. Across the Poldasht-Shah Takhti Bridge over the Aras is the Azerbaijani village of Şahtaxtı. It is one of the two Iran-Nakhchivan border crossings; the other is located near the city of Jolfa in East Azerbaijan Province. Also adjacent to Poldasht is the Aras River Dam.

References 

Poldasht County

Cities in West Azerbaijan Province

Populated places in West Azerbaijan Province

Populated places in Poldasht County